Chiswick is a district of west London, England.

Chiswick may also refer to:

Chiswick, New South Wales, a suburb of Sydney, Australia
Chiswick (ship), two ships
Chiswick House, a Palladian villa in Chiswick, London
Chiswick Press, an English publishing company
Chiswick Records, an English record label 1975–1983
Lord Chiswick, a character from the 1983–1989 British sitcom Blackadder

See also
Chiswick Park (disambiguation)
Cheswick (disambiguation)